Temple is the fifth and final studio album by alternative folk band Thao & the Get Down Stay Down, released in May 2020. The album was mixed by Mikaelin Bluespruce and mastered by Heba Kadry.

The album's first single, "Phenom", was released with a music video created using Zoom and heralded as "the first great Zoom music video."

Thao stated that the album addresses "the reservations that my family had about me being out publicly." She added, "Fear has been such an unfortunate and large presence in my career and in my life... But I'm just so glad to be out from under that." Temple also features a strong hip hop influence.

Track listing
"Temple"– 4:10
"Phenom"– 2:39
"Lion on the Hunt"– 3:14
"Pure Cinema"– 4:29
"Marauders"– 3:29
"How Could I"– 3:16
"Disclaim"– 3:12
"Rational Animal"– 4:19
"I've Got Something"– 4:41
"Marrow"– 3:29

Personnel 
 Thao Nguyen – vocals, songwriter, producer
 Adam Thompson – composer, producer
 Mikaelin "Blue" BlueSpruce – mixing
 Beau Sorenson – recording engineer, mixing (1)
 Heba Kadry – mastering

References

External links
Interview with Nguyen from NPR

2020 albums
Thao & the Get Down Stay Down albums
Ribbon Music albums